Qeshlaq-e Takqui-ye Qarah Piran-e Hazrat-e Qoli (also Romanized as Qeshlāq-e Takqū’ī-ye Qarah Pīrān-e Ḩaẕrat-e Qolī) is a village in Qeshlaq-e Gharbi Rural District, Aslan Duz District, Parsabad County, Ardabil Province, Iran. At the 2006 census, its population was 38, in 14 families.

References 

Towns and villages in Parsabad County